is the northernmost city in mainland Norway. It is located in Nordkapp Municipality in Troms og Finnmark county. Honningsvåg was declared a city in 1996, despite its small population.

Honningsvåg is situated at a bay on the southeastern side of the large island of Magerøya, while the famous North Cape and its visitor center is on the northern side of the island. Honningsvåg is a port of call for Hurtigruten Coastal Express and cruise ships, especially in the summer months. The ice-free ocean (the southwestern part of the Barents Sea) provides rich fisheries and tourism is also important to the town.

The famous dog Bamse came from Honningsvåg.

Transportation

Honningsvåg is one of the main stops of the Hurtigruten coastal ships on their lengthy route along the Norwegian coast between Kirkenes in the north and Bergen in the south. The northbound ships to Kirkenes dock in the port from 11:15 to 14:45, generating heavy tourist activity in the city. The southbound ships to Bergen make a short stop around 05:30.  

History

The area was first settled in prehistory, as early as 10,300 years ago. The sea was probably the main food source.

City status
Honningsvåg was declared a town in 1996 by the municipal council of Nordkapp.  National legislation was passed in 1997 that states that a Norwegian city must have at least 5,000 inhabitants, but since Honningsvåg was declared a city in 1996, it was exempt from this legislation. This makes it one of the smallest cities in Norway.

Name
The Old Norse form of the name was probably Hornungsvágr. The first element is then the genitive case of the (hypothetical) name of a mountain, Hornungr, which has since fallen into disuse. Hornungr could have been an older name of mount Storefjell (literally "big mountain"), a tall and hornlike peak near Honningsvåg, which would imply that the name was derived from the word horn. The last element is vágr, which means "bay". The full name thus means "the bay lying beneath the mountain Hornungr."

Notable people

Media gallery

Climate
Even though Honningsvåg is located at the northernmost extreme of Europe, it has a subarctic climate, thanks to the North Atlantic Drift. Located at the coast, Honningsvåg can experience strong winter storms and blizzard conditions, sometimes closing the road connection. On 29 December 2008, winds were recorded at 81 mph. Snow cover can be deep in winter, threatening avalanches in steep terrain. Precipitation is evenly spread throughout the year, but with a little peak in autumn. Honningsvåg has polar day with midnight sun from 13 May to 31 July. From 21 November to 21 January the sun is below the horizon (polar night).

See also
List of towns and cities in Norway

References

External links

http://www.northcape.no - history and culture of the North Cape area
Information from Nordkapp municipality
Visitnorway.com - about Honningsvåg

Populated places in Troms og Finnmark
Port cities and towns in Norway
Cities and towns in Norway
Barents Sea
Populated places of Arctic Norway
Magerøya